Minye was a town in ancient Thessaly. It is mentioned in an inscription dated to the 2nd century BCE from Pelasgiotis. It is unlocated.

References

Populated places in ancient Thessaly
Former populated places in Greece
Lost ancient cities and towns